The 2017 ADAC GT Masters was the eleventh season of the ADAC GT Masters, the grand tourer-style sports car racing founded by the German automobile club ADAC. The season started on 29 April at Motorsport Arena Oschersleben and ended on 24 September at Hockenheim after seven double-header meetings.

Entry list

Race calendar and results
The seven-event calendar for the 2017 season was announced on 23 November 2016. It was held along with the Deutsche Tourenwagen Masters at the Lausitzring.

Championship standings
Scoring system
Championship points were awarded for the first ten positions in each race. Entries were required to complete 75% of the winning car's race distance in order to be classified and earn points. Individual drivers were required to participate for a minimum of 25 minutes in order to earn championship points in any race.

Drivers' championships

Junior class

Trophy class

Teams' championship

Notes

References

External links
 

ADAC GT Masters seasons
ADAC GT Masters season